In Mixtec mythology, Dzahui or Dzavui was the god of rain. Child sacrifices were performed for Dzahui on the tops of hills during times of drought, sickness, and at harvest time.

In Mixtec codices, Dzahui exhibits the blue or green rain goggle mask also seen on the central Mexican deity Tlaloc.  He possesses exposed teeth incisors and longer, somewhat curled jaguar canine teeth emerging from curled lips. Occasionally, depictions of Dzahui depict the god with a blue or green protrusion, emerging from his nose.

See also
Chaac — Maya rain god
Cocijo — Zapotec rain god
Tlaloc — Aztec rain god
Achiutla — Spiritual and cultural Mixtec city disappeared.

References
 
 

Mixtec deities
Rain deities